During the 1996–97 English football season, Swindon Town F.C. competed in the Football League First Division.

Season summary
With Swindon's financial state getting more precarious, they could not afford to build a side which would be able to win promotion to the Premier League, with McMahon's only significant summer signing the underwhelming Gary Elkins from Wimbledon.
In 1996–97 season, Swindon held a mid-table position right up until the middle of March, but then scored just two goals in their last ten games – getting thumped 7–0 at Bolton, 5–1 at Oldham and 4–0 at Ipswich in the process – ending up in a disappointing 19th place.

Final league table

Results
Swindon Town's score comes first

Legend

Football League First Division

FA Cup

League Cup

Squad

References

Swindon Town F.C. seasons
Swindon Town